Michael Fitzmaurice may refer to:
 Michael Fitzmaurice (actor) (1908–1967), American actor
 Michael John Fitzmaurice (born 1950), American soldier
 Michael Fitzmaurice (politician) (born 1969), Irish politician
 Michael Fitzmaurice (Gaelic footballer) (born 1958), Irish Gaelic footballer